Xavier Anchetti (born 22 March 1866, date of death unknown) was a French fencer. He competed in the individual masters foil, sabre and épée events at the 1900 Summer Olympics.

References

External links
 

1866 births
Year of death missing
French male épée fencers
Olympic fencers of France
Fencers at the 1900 Summer Olympics
Sportspeople from Corse-du-Sud
French male foil fencers
French male sabre fencers